The 1864 United States presidential election in Vermont took place on November 8, 1864, as part of the 1864 United States presidential election. Voters chose five representatives, or electors to the Electoral College, who voted for president and vice president.

Vermont voted for the National Union candidate, Abraham Lincoln, over the Democratic candidate, George B. McClellan. Lincoln won the state by a wide margin of 52.20%.

With 76.10% of the popular vote, Lincoln's victory with in the state would be his second strongest victory in the country in terms of percentage in the popular vote after Kansas.

Results

See also
 United States presidential elections in Vermont

References

Vermont
1864
1864 Vermont elections